Wilbur Patey Sampson (16 September 191428 April 1958) was an Australian composer, conductor and musician active from the mid-1930s. Sampson wrote music for a number of movies produced in the 1940s and 1950s starring Chips Rafferty or Charles Tingwell, including Always Another Dawn, Into the Straight, King of the Coral Sea and Smiley Gets a Gun.

References

1914 births
1958 deaths
People from New South Wales
Australian composers
Australian musicians